Siroe re di Persia is a libretto in three acts by Pietro Metastasio. Set to music by Leonardo Vinci, it was first performed on 2 February 1726 at the Teatro San Giovanni Grisostomo, Venice. It was subsequently set to music at least 35 times by different composers.

Action
The action is set in Selucia in the year 628. The characters are:

 Cosroe (Khosrow II), King of Persia
 Siroe (Kavad II), his oldest son
 Medarse, his second son
 Emira, Princess of Cambaia, lover of Siroe disguised in men's clothing as Idaspe
 Laodice, lover of Siroe, sister of Arasse
 Arasse, General and friend of Siroe

The plot concerns the Persian king Cosroe, who wants to appoint his second son Medarse as his successor instead of his first-born son Siroe 
and thus arouses popular anger. The background to these events is that Cosroe had previously defeated his opponent Asbite, king of Cambaia, and had his family murdered. Only Asbite's daughter Emira survived to plan her revenge. For this purpose, she has disguised herself as a man and found her way into Cosroe's court under the assumed name of Idaspe. Only her lover, Cosroe's son Siroe, knows her true identity.

The following plot summary is based on the second version of the setting by Johann Adolph Hasse, performed in Dresden in 1763.

Act 1
A large temple dedicated to the Sun

Cosroe has called his sons to the temple of the sun to appoint his successor. Before he announces his choice, he extracts an oath from both of them to recognize his decision and keep the peace. His younger son Medarse is convinced that the choice will fall on him and immediately obeys. Siroe, however, refuses and accuses his father of preferring Medarse. As expected, Medarse is appointed heir. Emira arrives, disguised as Idaspe. In order to speak to Siroe alone, she sends Medarse away. Then she advises Siroe to call the people for support. In addition, as the price  of her love, she demands that he assist her in killing his father. Cosroe's mistress arrives - Laodice, who is secretly in love with Siroe. After Emira/Idaspe leaves the temple, Laodice asks Siroe to finally confess his love. However, he points to her relationship with Cosroe and indicates that there is another obstacle that he cannot yet reveal. Finally, he confesses to being in love with another and advises her to forget him. 

Laodice feels scorned and swears vengeance on Siroe. She decides to ask for help from her brother Arasse, a friend of Siroe's. Arasse tells her about the impending popular uprising over the choice of Medarse as heir. He asks Laodice to speak to Cosroe on Siroe's behalf. She refuses but Arasse is not willing to forfeit his friendship with Siroe.

Cosroe's inner room

Siroe wants to warn his father about Emira/Idaspe's revenge plan, but in order not to reveal his lover's identity, he writes an anonymous letter. As Cosroe arrives, he hides. Laodice also arrives and complains to Cosroe that Siroe has forced his attentions on her. Outraged, Cosroe sits down and finds Siroe's letter. Medarse also comes into the room. Cosroe reads the letter to him, warning of a traitor who is one of his best friends. Medarse now claims that he wrote the letter himself and that the traitor was none other than Siroe, who he says wanted his help to murder their father. Siroe leaves his hiding place and accuses Medarse of lying. Finally, Emira/Idaspe also comes in and learns about the content of the letter. Siroe continues to refuse to name the traitor and is now accused by Emira/Idaspe. Siroe complains that he cannot prove his innocence and leaves the room. Cosroe is unsure whether he can trust Idaspe. Medarse and Laodice express disappointment at Siroe's behavior. Unexpectedly, Emira/Idaspe now defends it. Laodice is confused about Emira's/Idaspe's behavior, but Medarse believes that his intrigues will soon lead to his achieving his goal.

Act 2
The royal zoo

Laodice regrets her actions, apologizes to Siroe and promises to speak to Cosroe to retract her false accusations. Siroe rejects this because it would only arouse suspicion. He just wants her to stop loving him. She leaves. 

Now Emira comes and accuses Siroe of infidelity and cowardice for not telling his father about her plan. She thinks that as children of enemies they should also be enemies. He should therefore have warned his father about her. Since she does not want to renounce her planned revenge, he pulls out his sword to kill himself. At that moment, Cosroe arrives and mistakenly thinks Siroe has drawn his sword against Idaspe. Siroe declares himself guilty of this and asks his father to end his life. When Emira/Idaspe points out that he has not yet disclosed the name of the conspirator, Siroe explains that it might even be Idaspe himself. However, Cosroe doesn't believe him and has him led away. With Cosroe now lost in thought about his son, Emira sees an opportunity to attack him and pulls out her own sword. However, she is interrupted by Medarse and talks herself out of the situation by laying her sword at Cosroe's feet. Cosroe feels honored and asks Emira/Idaspe to take the sword back and look for the traitor. She leaves.

Medarse reports to Cosroe that Siroe has already drawn the people to his side. The only solution now is to kill him. Since Cosroe rejects this, Medarse suggests that Siroe be appointed king in his place.  Cosroe no longer doubts Siroe's guilt, but also cannot bring himself to punish him.

A room near the zoo

Arasse urges Siroe to act but he refuses to do so. Arasse in any case swears allegiance to him and leaves. Cosroe and Emira/Idaspe come into the room. Cosroe wants to talk to Siroe alone. He has the room locked and sends Emira/Idaspe away, who nevertheless eavesdrops on their conversation. Cosroe tries everything possible to get Siroe to talk. He is ready to forgive him for wanting to seduce Laodice, seeking Idaspe's death and planning an uprising if only he will divulge the name of the traitor. Only when he declares that he also wants to forgive the traitor too does Siroe begin to speak but he is interrupted by Emira/Idaspe. Cosroe now offers Siroe to marry him to Laodice, but Siroe declares his revulsion for her. Now Cosroe thinks Siroe wants his death and asks him to kill him – but Siroe does not wish to do that either. Cosroe now has Laodice brought and gives Siroe an ultimatum: if he tells Idaspe the traitor's name, he will be named heir and have Laodice. Otherwise, a dungeon awaits him. After Cosroe leaves, Emira/Idaspe mocks Siroe's planned union with Laodice. Siroe replies that Idaspe should decide for him and leaves.

Emira/Idaspe then declares to Laodice that she/he is in love with her. Laodice asks Idaspe to change Siroe's mind as a sign of love. Emira/Idaspe refuses, and Laodice angrily leaves the room. Emira vacillates between her desire for revenge and her love for Siroe.

Act 3
Palace courtyard

Cosroe orders Arasse to kill Siroe. Arasse tries to change his mind, not believing that this will pacify the people. However, Cosroe is determined and Arasse finally agrees to carry out the order. Laodice tells Cosroe that the people are asking for Siroe. Cosroe tells her about the order to kill him. Laodice now admits that she wrongly accused Siroe of attempting to rape her because he did not return her love. She asks him to keep Siroe alive, but Cosroe will not change his mind.

Emira/Idaspe also begs Cosroe for mercy for Siroe and reminds him that Siroe was always an exemplary son. Her appeal succeeds and Cosroe gives her his seal as a sign of authority to stop the killing. Arasse returns and announces that Siroe is already dead.  Emira/Idaspe reproaches Cosroe and now reveals himself as Emira, surrendering her sword to Arasse. As she is led away, Cosroe remains inconsolable.

Locked prison cell in the fortress

Emira asks Arasse to kill her, but he confesses to her that he has only faked the death of Siroe, who is still alive. He asks Emira to hide for a while until he has called the people together, when Siroe will be hers. He then leaves. 

Medarse enters the dungeon and finds Emira there. Because he does not yet know her true identity, she shows him the royal seal as proof of the king's trust in her. When Medarse explains that he wants to kill Siroe, Emira/Idaspe tells him that he is already dead. In order to be certain however, Medarse wants to see the body. Emira decides to trick him and offers to help. Siroe then appears. Medarse draws the sword, but is filled with remorse and hands the weapon to Emira/Idaspe to kill Siroe. She however hands it to Siroe and reveals to Medarse her identity as Emira. Arasse arrives with his guards and reports that the people have chosen Siroe as king. He leaves and Emira follows him. With no supporters left, Medarse finally gives up. Siroe, however, generously forgives his brother and returns his weapon. Medarse, left alone, reflects on the value of virtue.

Large square in Seleukia 

The royal guard has been defeated in a final battle against the rebels. Cosroe, Emira and Siroe enter one after the other, followed by Arasse and the people. Cosroe is still defending himself against some of the conspirators. Emira tries to take her revenge on him, but Siroe stops her. Cosroe is happy to see his son alive again. Medarse and Laodice ask Cosroe to punish them for their offenses. Siroe explains that he is not angry with anyone and also asks Emira to forget her hatred. Only on these terms can he accept her as a lover. Emira eventually gives up her  revenge and Cosroe gives her to Siroe in marriage, declaring him king. The opera ends with a chorus.

Background
The historical basis for the drama is the deposition of the Persian king 
Khosrow II by his son Kavad II, recounted in the fourth volume of Epitome Historion by the Byzantine historian Johannes Zonaras as well as in the first book of Historia saracenica by the Christian Arab historian  George Elmacin (Ibn al-’Amid) and the eleventh volume of the Annales ecclesiastici by Cesare Baronio. These in turn are based on the Chronographia of Theophanes. Contemporary sources available to Metastasio may also have included  Cosroès by Jean Rotrou (1649) and the libretto Ormisda by  Apostolo Zeno (1721). The latter follows a similar plot, although its action takes place a generation earlier in the Sassanid dynasty.

The first setting of Metastasio's libretto was by Leonardo Vinci, which premiered on 2 February 1726 at Teatro San Giovanni Crisostomo in Venice. The principal roles were sung by Marianna Bulgarelli (known as “La Romanina“) as Emira and Nicolò Grimaldi (“Nicolini“) as Siroe. (They were the same two stars who had previously led the cast of Didone abbandonata in 1724.) The castrato Giovanni Carestini sang the role of Medarse. In Davide Perez's 1740 setting, the singers were  Caffarelli as Siroe and Giovanni Manzuoli as Medarse.

Settings to music

The following composers used this libretto as the basis for an opera:

Modern performances and recordings
 Georg Friedrich Händel:
 December 1925: German language performance in Gera.
 1962 and 1963: Performances at the Händel-Festspiele Halle, Orchester des Landestheaters Halle
 September 1989: CD recording, Brewer Baroque Chamber Orchestra.
 December 2000 and January 2001: Performances in the Scuola Grande de San Giovanni Evangelista in Venice, Venice Baroque Orchestra.
 May 2003: Performances at the Grace Episcopal Church in Chicago.
 May 2003: Performances in Cologne (CD recording available), Capella Coloniensis.
 January 2004: Concert performances at the Théâtre des Champs-Élysées Paris and the Arsenal de Metz, Venice Baroque Orchestra.
 February and April 2004: Performances in Berkeley and in the Brooklyn Academy of Music Harvey Theater, Venice Baroque Orchestra.
 October/November 2007: Productions at the Teo Otto Theater Remscheid and the Schauspielhaus Wuppertal.
 October 2009: Performance at the Stadttheater Neuburg
 June 2010: Performance from the Händel-Festspiele Halle at the Goethe-Theater Bad Lauchstädt.
 May 2013: Performance (Available on CD) at the :de:Deutsches Theater Göttingen, FestspielOrchester Göttingen.

 Johann Adolph Hasse:
 September 2008: Performance at St. Giles Church in London, Ensemble Serse.
 June 2009: Performance at the Savile Club in London, Ensemble Serse.
 November 2014: CD recording, Armonia Atenea.
 December 2017: Performances at the Oldenburgisches Staatstheater, Oldenburgisches Staatsorchester.

External links

 Various full text versions (Italian) of the libretto at progettometastasio.it.

Digital versions

References

1726 compositions
Libretti by Metastasio
1720s in literature
Opera seria
18th-century Italian literature